Graciella circulum is a species of beetle in the family Cerambycidae. It was described by Báguena in 1952.

References

Tragocephalini
Beetles described in 1952